JWH-147 is an analgesic drug used in scientific research, which acts as a cannabinoid agonist at both the CB1 and CB2 receptors. It is somewhat selective for the CB2 subtype, with a Ki of 11.0 nM at CB1 vs 7.1 nM at CB2. It was discovered and named after John W. Huffman.

Legal status
In the United States, CB1 receptor agonists of the 3-(1-naphthoyl)pyrrole class such as JWH-147 are Schedule I Controlled Substances.

JWH-147 was banned in Sweden on 1 October 2010 as harmful to health, after being identified as an ingredient in "herbal" synthetic cannabis products.

See also
 JWH-030
 JWH-307

References

CB1 receptor agonists
CB2 receptor agonists